Lynn Township may refer to:

 Lynn Township, Henry County, Illinois
 Lynn Township, Knox County, Illinois
 Lynn Township, Posey County, Indiana
 Lynn Township, Sioux County, Iowa
 Lynn Township, Michigan
 Lynn Township, McLeod County, Minnesota
 Lynn Township, Clay County, Nebraska
 Lynn Township, Wells County, North Dakota, in Wells County, North Dakota
 Lynn Township, Hardin County, Ohio
 Lynn Township, Lehigh County, Pennsylvania
 Lynn Township, Day County, South Dakota, in Day County, South Dakota
 Lynn Township, Lincoln County, South Dakota, in Lincoln County, South Dakota
 Lynn Township, Moody County, South Dakota, in Moody County, South Dakota

Township name disambiguation pages